Francis Dunnery (born 25 December 1962) is an English musician, singer-songwriter, record producer and record label owner.

Dunnery was the lead singer and guitarist for British prog-pop band It Bites between 1982 and 1990. Since 1990 he has pursued a solo career, and has owned and run his own record label, Aquarian Nation, since 2001.

He has collaborated with artists including Robert Plant, Ian Brown, Lauryn Hill, Santana and Anderson Bruford Wakeman Howe and as a producer and/or collaborator with David Sancious, Chris Difford (of Squeeze), James Sonefeld (Hootie and the Blowfish), Erin Moran, Steven Harris (ex-The Cult, Zodiac Mindwarp and the Love Reaction), and Ashley Reaks (Younger Younger 28s).

Dunnery was one of the candidates invited to audition as a lead singer and frontman for Genesis following Phil Collins' departure in 1996. He also played in the reformed 1960s beat/prog band The Syn between 2008 and mid-2009.

Early life

Francis Dunnery grew up as part of a working-class musical family in the small Cumberland town of Egremont (at 28 Queens Drive on the Gulley Flats estate). He is the younger son of Charlie Dunnery (a former member of the Jimmy Shand band) and his wife, Kathleen.

He displayed an interest in music from an early age, with his mother later recalling that "he was always drumming with his hands. Asking him what he wanted for his tea, he'd be drumming on something the whole time." His elder brother Barry "Baz" Dunnery (whom Dunnery cites as his greatest single influence) was a guitarist with heavy rock band Necromandus and subsequently Ozzy Osbourne's first post-Black Sabbath band and the ELO-spinoff Violinski.

Dunnery has described his family home as having been like "a bustling café" full of musicians and family friends of all generations, and recalls "my Mam and Dad were the greatest. They were kind, funny and gracious in a working class way. They were giving people. They had a way about them that made everyone feel welcome in our home... My Mam and Dad would feed them great food, share cigarettes and partake in humorous and interesting conversation."

His childhood was blighted by his parents' mutual alcoholism. He described them as "binge drinkers, two weeks on and two months off... Once my Mam and Dad started drinking alcohol I never knew what was going to happen. Everything seems to happen fast. One minute it was paradise and the next minute it was sheer hell. It was horrific. ... Anyone who has lived under this nervousness will know exactly what I mean. I lived under this constant threat all my life."

From the age of eleven, Frank spent four days a week living by himself on a trailer park to avoid problems at home, going to school during the day and bolstering his independence and living expenses by working as a musician at night. His first professional work was as half of an early teens duo with his friend Peter Lockhart which played local venues including the Tarnside Caravan Club and various cabaret venues. He recalls "we were the cute little duo that would open up for the main act... I would just bash along as Peter sang Elvis songs and played the organ." Adding guitar and singing to his musical skills, Dunnery moved on to other projects of varying levels of commitment – "I played in a few local bands and with lots of different musicians, especially a group called Waving at Trains I was in with Don Mackay, who is a fantastic musician. He wrote some really good songs, too." Waving At Trains featured Mackay as frontman, Dunnery on lead guitar and vocals, and Glyn Davies and Frank Hall on bass guitar and drums respectively (both of the latter having also played in bands with Frank's brother Barry, including Necromandus and Nerves).

Regarding this period, Dunnery commented "There was no one I could rely on... I somehow made sure that I had other places to live and spend my time (talk about the power of the human spirit) because I couldn't bear to be at home when my parents were drinking. I can still remember the smell of the house when my parents were drowning in hops. To this day the smell of Carlsberg Special Brew makes me want to vomit."

Career

1982–1990: It Bites

In 1982, when he was nineteen, Dunnery formed the rock band It Bites (taking the role of lead singer and guitarist). The other members of the band were his Egremont school friends Bob Dalton (drums, vocals) and Dick Nolan (bass, vocals); plus John Beck (keyboards, vocals) who came from Mirehouse, a suburb of Whitehaven. Following a career playing the pub and youth club circuit the band temporarily split, with Dunnery moving to London. The band reformed some time later and left Egremont entirely to relocate to London in 1984, eventually signing a record contract with Virgin Records.

It Bites released three studio albums, The Big Lad in the Windmill (1986), Once Around the World (1988) and Eat Me in St Louis (1989). It Bites' biggest hit single was "Calling All The Heroes" in 1986, which reached No. 6 in the UK Singles Chart. It Bites split up in 1990 in Los Angeles on the eve of recording their fourth studio album. Commenting on the breakup, Dunnery said: "the band had come to the end. It was a natural process. We fell out over a few things, there wasn't one big issue or problem, it was daft little things. We had just drifted apart. It wasn't anyone's fault, but we split." Following Dunnery's departure, It Bites briefly continued with a new frontman (Lee Knott) and a succession of new names (including Navajo Kiss and Sister Sarah) but split up after failing to sign a new recording deal. A post-breakup It Bites live album (drawn mainly from 1989 concerts) called "Thank You and Goodnight," was released in 1991.

1990–1995: Los Angeles and London

Following the 1990 break-up of It Bites, Dunnery moved to Los Angeles, indulging what he later acknowledged to be a disastrously hedonistic lifestyle. During this period he recorded his first solo album, Welcome to the Wild Country, which was released on Virgin Records in 1991 and produced by David Hentschel. The record enjoyed little success and was released only in Japan. He regained the rights in 2001, re-issuing it on Aquarian Nation Records. He has since described Welcome to the Wild Country as "having been recorded at a time when I didn't know who I was". Towards the end of his time in Los Angeles, Dunnery addressed his drugs and alcohol problems and cleaned up his lifestyle. He has subsequently been open about his problems with alcohol addiction and drug abuse during this period.

In 1993 Dunnery returned to the UK and joined Led Zeppelin singer Robert Plant's live band, performing on several tracks on Plant's 1993 album Fate of Nations and on the accompanying world tour.

Dunnery then released Fearless on Atlantic Records in 1994, promoting the album with his first solo tour of the UK. The Glasgow date of the tour was recorded for a live album, One Night in Sauchiehall Street, released in 1995.

1995–1999: New York and Vermont
In 1995, Dunnery relocated to New York City. His third studio album, Tall Blonde Helicopter, was released on Atlantic that year.

In 1996, Dunnery was approached to audition as lead singer for Genesis (although the position ultimately went to Ray Wilson).

Dunnery's next album, Let's Go Do What Happens, was released in 1998 on Razor and Tie Records, initially only in the United States. During this period, Dunnery also played on Lauryn Hill's 1998 debut album The Miseducation of Lauryn Hill, and Carlos Santana's 1999 album Supernatural.

Dunnery went into semi-retirement as a musician later in 1998 and set up a new home in the Vermont mountains where he devoted the next few years to breeding and training horses (for which he studied under John Lyons, the "horse whisperer") as well as carpentry, astrology, and Jungian psychology.

2000–2003: Return to music

In 2000, inspired by watching a televised Shakti concert, Dunnery later admitted he "realised there was still a musician in me, and that I had to be as true to that side of my character as I was being to the other sides." He decided to re-engage with the music business by returning to the UK for the first time in five years to play a few concerts, and by creating his own internet-based record label, Aquarian Nation, with the intention of releasing his future albums as well as albums by other artists.

For the UK tour, Dunnery formed a new backing band called The Grass Virgins, featuring second guitarist Dave Colquhoun, bass guitarist Matt Pegg, and singer/keyboard player Erin Moran, followed soon afterwards by a larger tour and support slots with Hootie and the Blowfish.

Dunnery's first new album following his comeback was Man, released in 2001. On the album, Dunnery said: "I was very depressed when I wrote the 'Man' CD. It was a difficult birth. I was going through such turmoil in my life. My mother was dying, my relationship was ending, and in complete contrast, my daughter Ava was being born. [But] I think I'm at peace with that side of my life now." Dunnery toured the UK to promote Man, accompanied by Matt Pegg on bass guitar. A live album – Hometown 2001 – was recorded 14 June 2001 at the Whitehaven Civic Hall in Cumbria and released later the same year.

During 2002, Dunnery played on and produced several albums released on Aquarian Nation. The first of these releases was Chris Difford's I Didn't Get Where I Am, with whom Dunnery also toured to promote the album. This was followed by John & Wayne's debut Nearly Killed Keith, and Songs From the Mission of Hope, the debut album by Stephen Harris.

In 2003, Dunnery performed with former It Bites members John Beck, Dick Nolan and Bob Dalton at the Union Chapel, with the event was recorded and released on DVD as Live at the Union Chapel the following year.

2004–2007
In 2005, Dunnery released The Gulley Flats Boys, a more sedate and acoustic album than its predecessor, featuring next to no drum or percussion parts and sparse use of electric guitar. It was recorded by Dunnery with piano/keyboard player David Sancious and Dorie Jackson on backing vocals.

In 2005, Dunnery embarked on a "house concert" world tour, suggesting to fans that they book him to perform in their own homes for a paying audience, in a drug and alcohol-free environment. Dunnery continues to perform house concerts to this day.

During the same year Dunnery was recruited into Steve Nardelli's revived 1960s progressive rock/beat band The Syn as guitarist, playing alongside Nardelli, Yes bassist Chris Squire, keyboard player Gerard Johnson and drummer Gary Husband. This lineup was scheduled to play as part of the More Drama Tour of summer and autumn 2005 (alongside two other Yes-related acts, White and Steve Howe). Dunnery left the band after the cancellation of the tour, and was replaced by Shane Theriot.

In October 2007 Dunnery released a free download of Feels Like Summertime, a song which had initially been written for It Bites shortly before the band's original split in 1990 and was reworked as part of the unsuccessful 2003 reunion.

2008–2011
In 2008, Dunnery performed numerous solo performances and house concerts, this time centred on material from Tall Blonde Helicopter. His summer and fall schedule included a full-band tour, culminating in a performance in Seattle which was recorded by Flying Spot, Inc. for subsequent release as a special edition concert/documentary DVD. (Originally scheduled for a 2009 release and titled Louder Than Usual, this was finally released in September 2010 as a DVD with accompanying CD)

In 2010, Dunnery released an "official video bootleg" DVD from the 2001 Man tour, titled In The Garden of Mystic Lovers, and produced and played on Snowman Melting, the first solo album by James Sonefeld of Hootie and the Blowfish.

In 2008, Dunnery rejoined The Syn as part of a new line-up also featuring Nardelli and keyboard player Tom Brislin. Although he didn't play on the Syn's "Reason and Ritual" single of October 2008, Dunnery was in the band for the US tour scheduled for spring 2009. Unfortunately, the tour was cancelled after six dates following Nardelli's return to the UK to pursue separate interests, with the band breaking up acrimoniously as a result after a final performance at Rosfest on 1 May 2009, recorded and eventually released as The Syn Live Rosfest in 2015. Brett Kull would dismiss the project as having "bad organization, bad mojo, bad energy."

Despite the Syn debacle, all members of the line-up (bar Nardelli) would continue to work with Dunnery. Kull, Brislin, Ramsey, Bishop and Jackson all appeared on Dunnery's next album There's a Whole New World Out There (released on 3 October 2009) as part of his new group The New Progressives. Consisting of reworkings of It Bites and solo songs from across Dunnery's career (plus covers of songs by Robert Plant, Genesis, David Sylvian and Joy Division) the album also featured guest appearances from guitarists Phil Campbell (Motorhead), Simon Rogers (Also Eden) and Luke Machin (Maschine, The Tangent), flute player Theo Travis (Soft Machine, Gong, The Tangent) and - perhaps most surprisingly - Dunnery's own replacement in It Bites, John Mitchell. The New Progressives toured the UK, American and Australia to promote the record, with various guests (from both on and off the record) appearing when available.

In 2009, Jem Godfrey (Frost*) announced on the Frost* Forum that he and Dunnery had both contributed solos to the title track of Big Big Train's upcoming album, The Underfall Yard.

2011–present

On 12 August 2011, Dunnery released the contemporary R'n'B-influenced Made in Space. He supported the album with a tour of the UK, which featured himself and Dorie Jackson. He also announced that he would be recorded a cover version of Peter Gabriel's The Rhythm of the Heat as part of Sonic Elements, a new "fantasy rock" band put together by Dave Kerzner.

In 2012, Dunnery made a guest appearance on Steve Hackett's album Genesis Revisited II, singing on two tracks – "Dancing With the Moonlit Knight" and "Supper's Ready" (the "As Sure As Eggs Is Eggs (Aching Men's Feet)" section) – as well as contributing additional guitar. Dunnery also made a guest appearance on Hackett's subsequent Genesis Revisited tour, singing at the Arcada Theater show in St Charles, Illinois on 20 September 2013, and at the Scottish Rites Auditorium in Collingswood, New Jersey.

From late 2012 to autumn 2013, Dunnery recorded Frankenstein Monster, a covers album featuring songs from his brother's former band Necromandus. Regarding the album, Dunnery commented: "I must say that this has been one hell of a journey both emotionally and musically. I learned so much about my brother during the making of this album and so much about myself ... Listening back now as it comes into focus I am very pleased and proud of the results. We have kept very close to the originals, sometimes exact and where it need a little more musicality or space we were smart enough to add our own parts without ruining the song. I know exactly what Baz would have liked so I only added things I know he would have liked.

In late 2013, Dunnery put together The Sensational Francis Dunnery Electric Band, which toured both Necromandus songs and songs from the Francis Dunnery back catalogue. The band also featured on Dunnery's 2016 release Vampires, an album of re-recorded It Bites songs.

In January 2016, Dunnery began broadcasting "The Francis Dunnery Radio Show" on British progressive rock radio station Progzilla Radio.

In February 2016, Dunnery released Vampires, the follow-up to There's a Whole New World Out There. Like its predecessor, it featured reworkings of old It Bites material with the smoother instrumentation which Dunnery now favoured. The album was also released as an instrumental-only version.

In July 2016, Dunnery continued his tendency to rework, remix and re-release with Return to the Wild Country, a re-recording of 1990's Welcome to the Wild Country solo debut. This was followed in March 2017 by Whole New World (a remix of There's a Whole New World Out There) and a remix of Frankenstein Monster in May 2017.

In November 2021, Dunnery released his first album of fully original material for eleven years. The Big Purple Castle was a download-only triple album with songs reflecting on Dunnery's past, his life in the music industry and his current philosophies.

In January 2022, Dunnery released the "winter remix" of The Gulley Flats Boys in both vocal/instrumental and instrumental-only form. In July 2022, he released Tall Blonde Helicopter Live, a remastered audio-only version of the live footage from his Louder than Usual DVD featuring a band with Brett Kull, Paul Ramsey and Jamie Bishop from his Syn/New Progressives era plus Erica Brilhart on keyboards.

Musical style
 Dunnery's musical approach is diverse. His early musical influences were progressive rock (with Genesis being a particular inspiration) and jazz-rock fusion musicians including John McLaughlin, Soft Machine, Focus, Return to Forever and Jeff Beck.

His aggressive and dramatic playing style merges hard rock, pop and funk stylings with a fluid, spiralling hammer-on lead-guitar technique inspired by Allan Holdsworth. He has criticised his lead guitar approach at that time as having been immature. He has also incorporated elements of jazz, classical and country fingerpicking into his style.

On his songwriting, Dunnery has said: "I cannot write songs on a nine-to-five basis. At the risk of sounding pretentious, my songs come from somewhere else and I have to wait for them, so it's not up to me when I receive them. When the songs start to come, they all come at the same time. I may get 20 songs in three to four days and then it all stops again."

Aside from singing and playing the guitar, Dunnery plays drums, bass guitar, organ, keyboards, percussion and tapboard (a guitar-related instrument).

Personal life

Dunnery has a daughter from a relationship with Jackie O'Sullivan. He married American singer Julie Daniels (frontwoman of the rock band Star 69) on 8 December 1990 in Las Vegas, Nevada. He was later in a relationship with Helena Faccenda, with whom he had a daughter in 1999. Around 2004 he met his girlfriend Erica Brilhart. During their relationship they had two children.

Charitable work
In 2002, Dunnery founded the Charlie and Kathleen Dunnery Children's Fund a volunteer-run fundraising charity based in his hometown of Egremont, and named in honour of his late parents. Explaining his reasons for setting up the charity, Dunnery has said "My mother was a wonderful woman... so this is my way of honouring her and my dad. A line in one of my songs is that the only thing you get to keep is what you give away – I like that idea. I think that by the time you are 40 if you aren't doing something to help others then you probably should be. People take all the time and I think it is nice to put something back."

The fund raises money for projects and activities supporting the health, wellness and educational needs of children and young people in the Egremont area. He continues to support the charity via regular concerts in Egremont as well as participation in and publicity for various sponsored events.

Discography

Studio albums
Welcome to the Wild Country (Virgin Records, 1991)
Fearless (Atlantic Records, 1994)
Tall Blonde Helicopter (Atlantic Records, 1995)
Let's Go Do What Happens (Razor and Tie Records, 1998)
Man (Aquarian Nation, 2001)
The Gulley Flats Boys (Aquarian Nation, 2005) (remixed and reissued 2022 as The Gulley Flats Boys - Winter Remix)
There's a Whole New World Out There (Aquarian Nation, 2009) (re-recordings of solo/It Bites songs, plus cover versions - remixed and reissued 2017 as Whole New World Remix)
Made in Space (Aquarian Nation, 2011)
Frankenstein Monster (Aquarian Nation, 2013) (cover versions and reworkings of Necromandus songs - remixed and reissued 2017 as Frankenstein Monster Remix)
Vampires (Aquarian Nation, 2016) (re-recordings of It Bites songs) 
Return to the Wild Country (Aquarian Nation, 2016) (complete re-recording/reworking of Welcome to the Wild Country)
The Big Purple Castle (Aquarian Nation, 2021)

Live
One Night in Sauchiehall Street (Cottage Industry 1995)
Hometown 2001 (Aquarian Nation, 2001)
Tall Blonde Helicopter Live (Aquarian Nation, 2022)

Singles
"American Life in the Summertime" (Atlantic Records, 1994) AUS #18
"What's He Gonna Say?" (Atlantic Records, 1995)
"Homegrown" (Atlantic Records, 1995) Australia
"Too Much Saturn" (Atlantic Records, 1995) USA/ UK Promo only
"The Way Things Are" (Atlantic Records, 1995) USA Promo only
"I Believe I Can Change My World" (Atlantic Records, 1996) Europe/ Australia
"Spiritual" (Atlantic Records, 1996) US Promo only 12"
"My Own Reality" (Razor & Tie, 1998) Promo only
"Riding on the Back" (Razor & Tie, 1998) US Promo only
"The Wounding & Healing of Men" (Aquarian Nation, 2003) US Promo only
"Good Life" (Aquarian Nation, 2005) US Promo only

DVDs
Live at the Union Chapel (Aquarian Nation, 2004)
In the Garden of Mystic Lovers (Aquarian Nation, 2008)
Louder than Usual (Aquarian Nation/Flying Spot Entertainment, 2010)

Other appearances

as group member 
It Bites – The Big Lad in the Windmill (Virgin/Geffen, 1986)
It Bites – Once Around the World (Virgin/Geffen, 1988)
It Bites – Eat Me in St. Louis (Virgin/Geffen, 1989)
It Bites – The It Bites Album (Virgin Japan, 1990 - compilation album)
It Bites – Thankyou and Goodnight – Live (Virgin, 1991 - live album)
It Bites – The Best of It Bites – Calling All the Heroes (EMI, 1995 - compilation album)
It Bites – Live in Montreux (It Bites self-released, 2003 - live album)
It Bites – Whole New World: The Virgin Albums 1986–1991 (Virgin, 2014 - box set)
It Bites – Live in London (It Bites self-released, 2018 - live album)
The Syn – Big Sky (Alliance Records, 2009)
The Syn – The Syn Live Rosfest (Umbrello Records, 2015)

guest and session appearances 
Anderson Bruford Wakeman Howe – Anderson Bruford Wakeman Howe (1989, Arista Records) – backing vocals.
Robert Plant – Fate of Nations (1993, Es Paranza) – rhythm guitar on 'Come into My Life, lead guitar on "Promised Land."
Lauryn Hill – The Miseducation of Lauryn Hill (1998) – guitar on "Every Ghetto, Every City" & "Nothing Even Matters."
Santana – Supernatural (1999) – rhythm guitar on "Do You Like The Way?"
Ian Brown – Music of the Spheres (2001, Polydor Records) – guitars on all tracks, also co-wrote "El Mundo Pequeño."
Big Big Train – The Underfall Yard (2009) – guest lead guitar on "The Underfall Yard."
Steve Hackett – Genesis Revisited II (2012) – lead vocal songs "Supper's Ready", "Dancing with the Moonlit Knight."

as producer
Chris Difford – I Didn't Get Where I Am (Aquarian Nation, 2002) – also co-wrote and played guitars and keyboards on all tracks.
John & Wayne – Nearly Killed Keith (Aquarian Nation, 2002) – also co-wrote and played drums and organ on all tracks.
Stephen Harris – Songs From The Mission of Hope (Aquarian Nation, 2002) – also co-wrote and played guitar, piano and Mellotron on all tracks.
John Gilmour Smith – The Story We've Been Sold (Aquarian Nation, 2010) – also co-wrote, and sang on several tracks

References

External links 
 Official Site
 Aquarian Nation Records
 It Bites Official Site

1962 births
Living people
English male singers
English rock guitarists
English male guitarists
English drummers
British male drummers
English record producers
English rock singers
English people of Irish descent
People from Egremont, Cumbria
It Bites members